Four Live may refer to:

Four Live (Irish TV programme), a 2010–2012 live Irish daytime programme that aired on RTÉ One
Four Live (New Zealand TV programme), a 2012–2014 New Zealand weekday afternoon television programme that aired on Four